The 1917 South Dublin by-election was held on 6 July 1917.  The by-election was held due to the death of the incumbent Irish Parliamentary MP, William Francis Cotton.  It was won by the Irish Parliamentary candidate Michael Louis Hearn, who was unopposed.

References

1917 elections in Ireland
1917 elections in the United Kingdom
By-elections to the Parliament of the United Kingdom in County Dublin constituencies
Unopposed by-elections to the Parliament of the United Kingdom (need citation)